Min Sang-ho (Hangul:민상호, Hanja:閔商鎬, 1870-1933) was Korean official and soldier of Korean Empire. He was part of the Chinilpa because he was ennobled as baron after annexation.

Life 
Min Sang-ho was born in 1870 as the son of Min Chi-uk as a member of Yeoheung Min clan in Seoul. He was educated in his home then, Dongmun-hak. In 1885, he went to Shanghai for studying and studied at the Maryland University. By recommendation of Bak Jeongyang, Min returned to Korea and was posted in Naemubu. After passing the Gwageo literary exam, Min entered the officialdom as Suchan (修撰). In 1894, Min became Waemu Cham-ui. During the Donghak Peasant Revolution, the Japanese army attempted, under the command of Ōtori Keisuke, to enter Seoul. Min was sent to stop the Japanese Army. However, the Japanese army avoided confronting with Min; therefore, the Japanese Army was able to enter Seoul. Form 1897 for 19 months, Min was sent to United Kingdom of Great Britain, Germany, Russia, Italy, France, and Austria-Hungary as an ambassador. Along with Min Young-hwan, Yun Chi-ho, and Yi Sang-jae, Min was recognized as one of the Pro-American politicians.

In October 1898, Min was appointed as Vice minister of Ministry of Foreign Affairs. On 28 November 1898, when Pak Chesoon was out of office, he became the acting Minister of Foreign Affairs, until Pak returned his office. When Prince Henry of Prussia visited Incheon, Min was one of the Korean officials who greeted him in Incheon. Moreover, during the banquet of Prince Henry, Crown Prince, and the Emperor, Min was the translator of it. On 21 March 1900, Min became Vic Minister of Nongsanggongbu. And on 26 March 1900, Min was appointed as Chongpan of Imperial Department of Communications. On 16 September 1902, Min was appointed as Major General. On 9 March 1904, Min replaced Lee Hak-gyun as the chief of military court. He served as Observer of Gangwon Province, then President of Jaedoguk, then Observer of Gyeonggi Province, then special official of Gungnaebu in the year of 1906. In 1907, Min was Jihugak of Gyujanggak and Principle of Suhakwon.
From 1908, he joined Dongyang organization which helped the colonization of Taiwan and Korea. Min donated 50 Won to the organization. When Ernest Bethell died, Min donated 100 Won to build his statue. On 1 October 1910, Min was appointed as a member of Junchuwon. He was entitled as Baron on 10 October 1910,and received 25,000 Won in January 1911 for his merit of colonization. In 1912 he received Decoration for Colonization of Korea. He died in 1933 in Korea.

Honours 

 Order of the Taegeuk 3rd Class in 1901
 Order of the Taegeuk 2nd Class in 1904

 Decoration for Colonization of Korea in 1912

 Order of the Rising Sun 2nd Class in June 1927

References 

1870 births
1933 deaths
Officials of the Korean Empire
Imperial Korean military personnel
Major generals of Korean Empire
Yeoheung Min clan
Korean collaborators with Imperial Japan
Joseon Kazoku